Antona myrrha is a moth of the subfamily Arctiinae first described by Pieter Cramer in 1775. It is found in Suriname.

References

Lithosiini
Moths described in 1775
Moths of South America
Taxa named by Pieter Cramer